Parortholitha ingens  is a species of moth of the family Geometridae first described by Claude Herbulot in 1970. It is found in northern Madagascar.

The length of its forewings is 18.5 mm.

References

Larentiinae
Moths described in 1970
Moths of Madagascar
Moths of Africa